Garmen Tabor ( Garmen Suurmets; born on 19 April 1968 in Rakvere) is an Estonian actress and theatre director.

In 1992 she graduated from the Tallinn State Conservatory's Performing Arts Department. From 1992 until 2002, she worked at Estonian Drama Theatre, 2002–2003 at Vanalinnastuudio. 2003–2007 she was a freelance actress. 2005–2008 she worked at Kuressaare Linnateater. 2009–2011 she was stage manager and director at Estonia Theatre. Since 2019 she is the head of Ugala Theatre. Besides theatre roles, she has appeared in films; she has given voice to several animated film characters, and has appeared on television.

She has been married to actor Margus Tabor since 1989.

Filmography

 1995: Õnne 13
 2001: Ladybirds' Christmas (animated film; in the role: Mother (voice))
 2006: Leiutajateküla Lotte (animated film; in the role: Anna (voice))
 2007: Sügiseleegia (animated film; in the role:	Betty)
 2011: Lotte ja kuukivi saladus (animated film; in the role:	Lotte's mother Anna (voice))
 2019: Lotte ja kadunud lohed (animated film; in the role: Hilde (voice))

References

Living people
1968 births
Estonian stage actresses
Estonian film actresses
Estonian television actresses
Estonian voice actresses
20th-century Estonian actresses
21st-century Estonian actresses
Estonian theatre directors
Estonian Academy of Music and Theatre alumni
People from Rakvere